The Newcomers  may refer to:

 The Newcomers (TV series), a 1960s British soap opera aired by the BBC
 The Newcomers (TV miniseries), a 1970s Canadian television series aired by the CBC
 The Newcomers (ballet), a ballet by Miriam Mahdaviani